U-14 may refer to one of the following German submarines:

 , was a Type U 13 submarine launched in 1911 and that served in the First World War until sunk on 5 June 1915
 During the First World War, Germany also had these submarines with similar names:
 , a Type UB I submarine launched in 1915 and surrendered in November 1918
 , a Type UC I submarine launched in 1915 and sunk on 3 October 1917; while in Austro-Hungarian service in 1915, she was renamed U-18
 , a Type IIB submarine that served in the Second World War and was scuttled on 2 May 1945
 , a Type 206 submarine of the Bundesmarine that was launched in 1973 and scrapped in 1997

U-14 or U-XIV may also refer to:
 , the former ; captured, raised, and commissioned into the Austro-Hungarian Navy during the First World War

Submarines of Germany